In mathematics a translation surface is a surface obtained from identifying the sides of a polygon in the Euclidean plane by translations. An equivalent definition is a Riemann surface together with a holomorphic 1-form.

These surfaces arise in dynamical systems where they can be used to model billiards, and in Teichmüller theory. A particularly interesting subclass is that of Veech surfaces (named after William A. Veech) which are the most symmetric ones.

Definitions

Geometric definition 

A translation surface is the space obtained by identifying pairwise by translations the sides of a collection of plane polygons.

Here is a more formal definition. Consider the space obtained by identifying all  with their corresponding  through the map .

In the case where these two lines form a polygon (i.e. they do not intersect outside of their endpoints) there is a natural side-pairing.

The quotient space is a closed surface. It has a flat metric outside the set  images of the vertices.

Analytic definition 

Let  be a translation surface as defined above and  the set of singular points. This gives  the structure of a Riemann surface, which extends to the entire surface  by Riemann's theorem on removable singularities. In addition, the differential  where  is any chart defined above, does not depend on the chart.

Examples 

The simplest example of a translation surface is obtained by gluing the opposite sides of a parallelogram. It is a flat torus with no singularities.

If  is a regular -gon then the translation surface obtained by gluing opposite sides is of genus  with a single singular point, with angle .

The map from the surface to the flat torus obtained by identifying all squares is a branched covering with branch points the singularities (the cone angle at a singularity is proportional to the degree of branching).

Riemann–Roch and Gauss–Bonnet 

Then the Riemann–Roch theorem implies that

If the translation surface  is represented by a polygon  then triangulating it and summing angles over all vertices allows to recover the formula above (using the relation between cone angles and order of zeroes), in the same manner as in the proof of the Gauss–Bonnet formula for hyperbolic surfaces or the proof of Euler's formula from Girard's theorem.

Translation surfaces as foliated surfaces 

If it is obtained from a polygon it is just the image of vertical lines, and the measure of an arc is just the euclidean length of the horizontal segment homotopic to the arc.

Moduli spaces

Strata 

Let  be the set of translation surfaces of genus  (where two such  are considered the same if there exists a holomorphic diffeomorphism  such that ). Let  be the moduli space of Riemann surfaces of genus ; there is a natural map  mapping a translation surface to the underlying Riemann surface. This turns  into a locally trivial fiber bundle over the moduli space.

The stratum  is naturally a complex orbifold of complex dimension  (note that  is the moduli space of tori, which is well-known to be an orbifold; in higher genus, the failure to be a manifold is even more dramatic). Local coordinates are given by
 

Masur-Veech volumes 

The stratum  admits a -action and thus a real and complex projectivization . The real projectivization admits a natural section  if we define it as the space of translation surfaces of area 1.

The existence of the above period coordinates allows to endow the stratum  with an integral affine structure and thus a natural volume form . This volume was proved to be finite independently by William A. Veech and Howard Masur.

They observed that  should be of the form  times a rational number. From this observation they expected the existence of a formula expressing the volumes in terms of  intersection numbers on moduli spaces of curves.

Alex Eskin and Andrei Okounkov gave the first algorithm to compute these volumes. They showed that the generating series of these numbers are q-expansions of computable quasi-modular forms. Using this algorithm they could confirm the numerical observation of Kontsevich and Zorich.

Currently the problem is still open to extend this formula to strata of half-translation surfaces.

The SL2(R)-action 

If  is a translation surface obtained by identifying the faces of a polygon  and  then the translation surface  is that associated to the polygon .

Half-translation surfaces

Definitions 

A half-translation surface is defined similarly to a translation surface but allowing the gluing maps to have a nontrivial linear part which is a half turn. Formally, a translation surface is defined geometrically by taking a collection of polygons in the Euclidean plane and identifying faces by maps of the form  (a "half-translation"). Note that a face can be identified with itself.

Relation with Teichmüller geometry 

This can be proven by analytic means using the Bers embedding.

In facts the paths used in this construction are Teichmüller geodesics. An interesting fact is that while the geodesic ray associated to a flat surface corresponds to a measured foliation, and thus the directions in tangent space are identified with the Thurston boundary, the Teichmüller geodesic ray associated to a flat surface does not always converge to the corresponding point on the boundary, though almost all such rays do so.

Veech surfaces

The Veech group 

Equivalently,  is the group of derivatives of affine diffeomorphisms  (where affine is defined locally outside the singularities, with respect to the affine structure induced by the translation structure). Veech groups have the following properties: 
They are never cocompact.

Veech groups can be either finitely generated or not.

Veech surfaces 

Since it is not cocompact it must then contain parabolic elements.

Examples of Veech surfaces are the square-tiled surfaces, whose Veech groups are commensurable to the modular group .  The square can be replaced by any parallelogram (the translation surfaces obtained are exactly those obtained as ramified covers of a flat torus). In fact the Veech group is arithmetic (which amounts to it being commensurable to the modular group) if and only if the surface is tiled by parallelograms.

There exists Veech surfaces whose Veech group is not arithmetic, for example the surface obtained from two regular pentagons glued along an edge: in this case the Veech group is a non-arithmetic Hecke triangle group. On the other hand, there are still some arithmetic constraints on the Veech group of a Veech surface: for example its trace field is a number field that is totally real.

Geodesic flow on translation surfaces

Geodesics 

A geodesic in a translation surface (or a half-translation surface) is a parametrised curve which is, outside of the singular points, locally the image of a straight line in Euclidean space parametrised by arclength. If a geodesic arrives at a singularity it is required to stop there. Thus a maximal geodesic is a curve defined on a closed interval, which is the whole real line if it does not meet any singular point. A geodesic is closed or periodic if its image is compact, in which case it is either a circle if it does not meet any singularity, or an arc between two (possibly equal) singularities. In the latter case the geodesic is called a saddle connection.

Dynamical properties 

On a flat torus the geodesic flow in a given direction has the property that it is either periodic or ergodic. In general this is not true: there may be directions in which the flow is minimal (meaning every orbit is dense in the surface) but not ergodic. On the other hand, on a compact translation surface the flow retains from the simplest case of the flat torus the property that it is ergodic in almost every direction.

Another natural question is to establish asymptotic estimates for the number of closed geodesics or saddle connections of a given length.

, 
The constants  are called Siegel–Veech constants.

Veech dichotomy 

The geodesic flow on a Veech surface is much better behaved than in general. This is expressed via the following result, called the Veech dichotomy:

Let  be a Veech surface and  a direction.

Relation with billiards 

If  is a polygon in the Euclidean plane and  a direction there is a continuous dynamical system called a billiard. The trajectory of a point inside the polygon is defined as follows: as long as it does not touch the boundary it proceeds in a straight line at unit speed; when it touches the interior of an edge it bounces back (i.e. its direction changes with an orthogonal reflection in the perpendicular of the edge), and when it touches a vertex it stops.

This dynamical system is equivalent to the geodesic flow on a flat surface: just double the polygon along the edges and put a flat metric everywhere but at the vertices, which become singular points with cone angle twice the angle of the polygon at the corresponding vertex. This surface is not a translation surface or a half-translation surface, but in some cases it is related to one. The dynamics of the billiard flow can then be studied through the geodesic flow on the translation surface.

For example, the billiard in a square is related in this way to the billiard on the flat torus constructed from four copies of the square; the billiard in an equilateral triangle gives rise to the flat torus constructed from an hexagon. The billiard in a "L" shape constructed from squares is related to the geodesic flow on a square-tiled surface; the billiard in the triangle with angles  is related to the Veech surface constructed from two regular pentagons constructed above.

Relation with interval exchange transformations 

Then this map is an interval exchange transformation and it can be used to study the dynamic of the geodesic flow.

Notes

References 

Surfaces
Dynamical systems